is a series of fighting games released only in Japan for the PlayStation 2 based on the manga and anime Bleach by Tite Kubo. There are two games in the series, both developed by Racjin and published by SCEI. Both games became best-sellers in Japan.

Gameplay
In the Blade Battlers series, the player takes control of one of many characters from the source material. As with most other fighting games, the idea is to fight the opposing character, or characters in the free-for-all mode, until their health is fully depleted. Players can use their characters' special abilities taken from the series, such as Ichigo Kurosaki's ability to unlock his bankai state or Rukia Kuchiki's control over ice with her zanpakutō. Some of these abilities may alter the arena, such as Rukia's zanpakutō causing the battlefield to become covered in ice and making other players slide around.

In Blade Battlers 2, specials attacks have been changed into special forms, resulting in the altering of area obstacles such as random attacks from summonings, shifting the area, etc.

Both games feature extensive battle modes, where you unlock characters after beating all of the challenges. Some missions have you perform under certain circumstances, like a time limit. In both games there is a bonus section where you can view character models and extras.

History

Bleach: Blade Battlers
Bleach Blade Battlers is the first installment of the Blade Battlers series and was released in Japan on October 12, 2006. The game features 23 playable characters.

Bleach: Blade Battlers 2nd

 is the second installment in the Blade Battlers series. The game was released on September 27, 2007. Blade Battlers 2nd features 36 playable characters.

Playable characters

See also
 Bleach
 List of Bleach video games
 List of PlayStation 2 games

References

External links
 Official Bleach Battlers homepage
 Official Blade Battlers 2nd homepage

Shueisha franchises
Sony Interactive Entertainment franchises
Blade Battlers
PlayStation 2 games
PlayStation 2-only games
Japan-exclusive video games
Video games developed in Japan
Video games with cel-shaded animation